Cucullanus parapercidis is a species of parasitic nematodes. It is an endoparasite of fish, the Yellowbar sandperch Parapercis xanthozona (Pinguipedidae, Perciformes), which is the type-host, and the Speckled sandperch Parapercis hexophtalma. The species has been described in 2020 by František Moravec & Jean-Lou Justine from material collected off New Caledonia in the South Pacific Ocean.

References 

Ascaridida
Parasitic nematodes of fish
Nematodes described in 2020
Fauna of New Caledonia
Endoparasites